Donna on Demand is a 2009 direct-to-video dark comedy film written, directed, co-produced by, and starring Corbin Bernsen. The film was released on DVD on September 15, 2009. It takes place in Los Angeles, California.

It is most notable for being the subject of the final two trades made by Kyle MacDonald in his attempt to turn one red paperclip into a house by barter alone. On or about June 2, 2006, he traded a KISS motorised snow globe to Bernsen for a role in the movie; a month later, on or about July 5, he traded the role away for a farmhouse in Kipling, Saskatchewan. During celebrations in Kipling related to the trade, auditions were held for the role and it ultimately went to Nolan Hubbard (a recent high school graduate at the time).

Cast
 Corbin Bernsen as Ben Corbin
 Lyndsay Brill as The Redhead
 Jeanne Cooper as Virginia Hart
 Charles Dennis as Charlie
 Joseph DeVito as Crazy Fan
 Neil Dickson as Tony
 Steve Fite as Lone Guy
 Adrienne Frantz as Donna
 Nolan Hubbard as Ned / Prime8 
 Dan Lauria as Detective Lewis
 Devin Mills as Victoria
 Annabelle Milne as Lone Girl
 Brock Morse as Camera Guy
 Paul Renteria as Paulo
 Jason Rogel as Utility Nerd
 Susan Ruttan as Rose
 Brad Surosky as Cyber Nerd
 William Tempel as Surly Fan
 Scott Vance as Limp Dick
 Larry Varanelli as Detective Clark
 J.W. Wallace as Monkey Mask

See also
One red paperclip

References

External links

2009 black comedy films
2009 films
American black comedy films
Films directed by Corbin Bernsen
Films set in Los Angeles
2009 comedy films
2000s English-language films
2000s American films